Ivor Archie  (born August 18, 1960) is a Trinidadian jurist who has served as chief justice of Trinidad and Tobago since 2008. He was formerly solicitor general of the Cayman Islands.

Personal life 

He was born on August 18, 1960 in Tobago. He attended Scarborough Anglican Boys’ School, Bishop’s High School, and St Mary’s College.

He is married to Denise Rodriguez-Archie and they have two children, Chinyere and Sean.

Career 

He graduated with a BSc in Mechanical Engineering (upper second class honours) from the University of the West Indies in 1980. He worked as an engineer at Trintoplan Consultants Limited in Trinidad and at Schlumberger in Libya.

Archie then studied law at the Solent University in Southampton, England, receiving his LLB in 1984. He received his Legal Education Certificate at Hugh Wooding Law School in St Augustine. He was admitted to the Bar of Trinidad and Tobago in 1986. Archie worked initially for Clarke and Company. He then served as State Counsel and Senior Crown Counsel for the governments of Trinidad and Tobago, the Turks and Caicos Islands and the Cayman Islands. He was Solicitor General of the Cayman Islands and acted on occasion as the Attorney General.

On March 1, 1998, he was appointed a puisine judge of the Supreme Court of Judicature. He became a Justice of Appeal on April 2, 2004 and chief justice on January 24, 2008. He is the eighth chief justice of Trinidad and Tobago and the youngest person to have taken the role. He is Chairman of the Judicial and Legal Services Commission, President of the Trinidad and Tobago Judicial Education Institute, and a fellow of the Board of the Commonwealth Judicial Education Institute. In 2013, he received the Order of the Republic of Trinidad and Tobago.

References

External links

Living people
20th-century Trinidad and Tobago judges
University of the West Indies alumni
Trinidad and Tobago engineers
Schlumberger people
Alumni of Solent University
Chief justices of Trinidad and Tobago
People educated at Saint Mary's College, Trinidad and Tobago
1960 births
Solicitors-General of the Cayman Islands
21st-century Trinidad and Tobago judges
Recipients of the Order of the Republic of Trinidad and Tobago